Yang Rong (born 3 June 1981) is a Chinese actress of Bai origin. She is best known for her roles in Cosmetology High and Memory Lost.

Early life
Born in Baoshan, Yunnan, on June 3, 1981, Yang Rong graduated from Shanghai Theatre Academy, where she majored in acting.

In 1992, at the age of 10, she enrolled at Yunnan Art School to study dance. Two years later, she studied acting in Shanghai Normal University Xie Jin School of film and Television Art. In 1997, by age 15, she was accepted to Shanghai Theatre Academy and graduated in 2001.

Career
Yang Rong made her acting debut in Xie Jin's war epic film The Opium War, playing a servant girl. She gained attention in the early 2000s for her roles in Young Emperor (2001), The Censor of Qing Dynasty (2003) and Young Justice Bao 3 (2005). In 2007, Yang was cast as Qing Wen in the drama Dream of the Red Chamber, based on Cao Xueqin's classical novel. In 2008, she starred alongside Chen Kun and Liu Ye in romantic drama Love Ensure This Life.

Yang first worked with Yu Zheng in 2010, and appeared in her first comedy series Happy Mother-in-law, Pretty Daughter-in-law (2010). Her performance received positive reviews and the following year, Yang was signed to Yu Zheng's studio. She was then cast in Palace 2 (2012), the second installment of Yu Zheng's Gong series wherein she played an antagonist. In 2013, she played contrasting roles in two of Yu's productions; a cold and domineering concubine in historical television series Legend of Lu Zhen and an adorable and young lady in wuxia series Swordsman. Both series were popular and earned high ratings, leading to increased popularity for Yang. Known for portraying notable second leading roles, Yang impressed audiences with her performances in Palace 3: The Lost Daughter (2014), Love Yunge from the Desert (2015) and Lady & Liar (2015), at times even outshining the main leads.

After numerous secondary roles, Yang was finally cast by Yu Zheng in her first leading role, in the historical television drama Cosmetology High (2014). The series was one of the most watched dramas in China while it aired on Hunan Television, and established Yang as a leading actress in her own right. In 2016, Yang starred in crime drama Memory Lost, adapted from Ding Mo's novel. The series was a hit in China and internationally, and raised Yang's popularity. This was followed by another leading role in the well-received police drama, K9 Coming.

Filmography

Film

Television series

Awards and nominations

References

External links

 

1981 births
People from Baoshan, Yunnan
Living people
Shanghai Theatre Academy alumni
Chinese film actresses
Chinese television actresses
Actresses from Yunnan
Bai people
21st-century Chinese actresses